The 2020 Tajik Supercup was the 11th Tajik Supercup, an annual Tajik football match played between the winners of the previous season's Tajikistan Higher League and Tajikistan Cup. The match was contested by 2019 League and Cup champions Istiklol, and the league runners-up Khujand. It was held at the Pamir Stadium in Dushanbe on 4 April.

Background
On 27 March, the Tajikistan Football Federation announce that the opening round of games would be played behind closed doors due to the threat of the COVID-19 pandemic, with referee Nasrullo Kabirov being confirmed as the match official on 1 April.

Match details

See also
2019 Tajik League
2019 Tajik Cup

References

Super Cup
Tajik Supercup